Clarence Edwin Watkins (July 1, 1894 – November 13, 1944) was a long term editor of the Chillicothe Constitution-Tribune.

He was born on July 1, 1894 in Chillicothe, Missouri to James Edward Watkins and Martha Pearl Ireland. He died on November 13, 1944 in Chillicothe, Missouri. He was buried on November 15, 1944 in Edgewood Cemetery.

References

1894 births
1944 deaths
American newspaper editors
People from Chillicothe, Missouri